The Melonheads are a group of fans of the Los Angeles Rams that attend games with a carved out watermelon placed on their head. The Melonheads are similar to the Cheeseheads of the Green Bay Packers with their usage of food memorabilia on their heads—though Wisconsin is known for cheese products, while Los Angeles is not known for watermelons.

Origins
The group first started with five people in 1985, when they were called the Fearsome Fivesome. Lance Goldberg, the founder of the Melonheads, was inducted into the Pro Football Hall of Fame as part of the VISA Hall of Fans in 2000. The Melonheads group have appeared more often at Rams games after the team relocated back to Los Angeles from St. Louis in 2016.

References

1985 introductions
Los Angeles Rams
Spectators of American football
American regional nicknames
California culture